Nikola Rađen (born 29 January 1985) is a Serbian water polo player who plays for Serbian club Crvena zvezda. He was a member of the Serbia men's national water polo team at the 2008 Beijing Olympics. He won with Serbia the 2009 World Championship as well as the 2012 Eindhoven European Championship. Rađen has also won 2 LEN Euroleagues with his former clubs Partizan Raiffeisen (2011) and VK Crvena zvezda (2013).

National career

2012 Eindhoven
On 16 January, at the European Championship Rađen scored in the first game two goals in an 8–5 win against Spain. After next two games without goals, on 21 January in the fourth match, Rađen scored his third goal of the tournament for his national team in a routine victory against Romania 14–5. Nikola Rađen won the 2012 European Championship on 29 January. He scored a goal in the final against Montenegro which his national team won by 9–8. This was his first gold medal at the European Championships.

Honours

Club
VK Partizan
 LEN Champions League (1):  2010–11
 National Championship of Serbia (5): 2006–07, 2007–08, 2008–09, 2009–10, 2010–11
 National Cup of Serbia (5): 2006–07, 2007–08, 2008–09, 2009–10, 2010–11
 Eurointer League (2): 2010, 2011
VK Crvena Zvezda
 LEN Champions League  (1):  2012–13
 LEN Super Cup (1): 2013
 National Championship of Serbia (1): 2012–13
 National Cup of Serbia (1): 2012–13
 Eurointer League (1): 2013
Olympiacos

National Championship of Greece (1): 2014–15
 National Cup of Greece (1): 2014–15
CSM Digi Oradea

National Championship of Rumania (1) : 2016–17

Dynamo Moscow

National Championship of Russia (2): 2017–18, 2018–19

National Cup of Russia (2):  2017–18, 2018–19

Failed drug test
On May 15, 2015, Serbian media published that Rađen was tested positive for cocaine after the World League game between Serbia and Spain, held on February 17, 2015. The penalty for such doping violation is 4 years of not participating in any kind of sport events. On May 18, 2015, he was officially temporary suspended by FINA due to continued investigation into his positive doping results to cocaine metabolites. Furthermore, two days later, Olympiacos, the club with whom he was under the contract, terminated the contract for violating the terms of it. On August 24, 2015, he was officially suspended on a 4-year period by FINA for positive doping results; from tests taking place on February 17, and nearly two months later, on April 15.

See also
 List of Olympic medalists in water polo (men)
 List of world champions in men's water polo
 List of World Aquatics Championships medalists in water polo

References

 juegosmediterraneos

External links
 

1985 births
Living people
Sportspeople from Novi Sad
Serbian male water polo players
Water polo centre backs
Water polo players at the 2008 Summer Olympics
Water polo players at the 2012 Summer Olympics
Medalists at the 2008 Summer Olympics
Medalists at the 2012 Summer Olympics
Olympic bronze medalists for Serbia in water polo
World Aquatics Championships medalists in water polo
European champions for Serbia
Competitors at the 2005 Mediterranean Games
Competitors at the 2009 Mediterranean Games
Mediterranean Games medalists in water polo
Mediterranean Games gold medalists for Serbia
Mediterranean Games bronze medalists for Serbia
Universiade medalists in water polo
Universiade gold medalists for Serbia and Montenegro
Olympiacos Water Polo Club players
Doping cases in water polo
Serbian sportspeople in doping cases